Ilham Azizaga oglu Zakiyev (born 3 March 1980, Sumgayit) is an Azerbaijani blind judoka. He began studying judo when he was 11 years of age. In 1998, when he was 18, he went to serve in Azerbaijani army in the Aşağı Əbdürrəhmanlı village of Fizuli Rayon. He served on the frontline of the conflict zone. On 4 February 1999, he was wounded by a bullet to the head by an Armenian sniper, while on a combat mission. The bullet passed through the entire head, entering from the left and exiting via the right temple. As a result, Zakiyev has completely lost his eyesight. After a long rehabilitation he returned to the sport but as a paralympian. He is the holder of a 7-dan black belt.

He won a gold medal in the 2004 Athens Paralympics and the 2008 Beijing Paralympics in the +100 kg division.  Zakiyev has been European champion eight times, and has twice been the World champion.

Personal life
In 2008, Zakiyev received the Shohrat Order for his services in the development of Azerbaijani sport.

He is an avid supporter of Neftchi Baku.

References

External links

 
 
 
 Nicolas Messner. Ilham Zakiyev: An Exemplary Colossus // IJF, 13. Aug 2018.

1980 births
Living people
Azerbaijani male judoka
Judoka at the 2004 Summer Paralympics
Judoka at the 2008 Summer Paralympics
Judoka at the 2012 Summer Paralympics
Paralympic gold medalists for Azerbaijan
Paralympic judoka of Azerbaijan
Sportspeople with a vision impairment
Paralympic bronze medalists for Azerbaijan
Medalists at the 2004 Summer Paralympics
Medalists at the 2008 Summer Paralympics
Medalists at the 2012 Summer Paralympics
People from Sumgait
Judoka at the 2015 European Games
European Games medalists in judo
European Games gold medalists for Azerbaijan
Paralympic medalists in judo